Chandra Ekanayake is a Sri Lankan judge and lawyer. She was a sitting judge of the Supreme Court of Sri Lanka and since 2012 is also a non-resident Justice of Appeal of the Supreme Court of Fiji.

Ekanayake was educated at Sanghamitta Balika Vidyalaya, Galle and Visakha Vidyalaya, Colombo, thereafter she entering the Sri Lanka Law College.

Ekanayake was admitted to the bar in 1974 and severed from 1979 to 1980 a judge of the Primary Court.

Her husband Tissa Ekanayake is also a senior High Court Judge.

References

Puisne Justices of the Supreme Court of Sri Lanka
Sinhalese judges
20th-century Sri Lankan people
21st-century Sri Lankan people
Sri Lankan judges on the courts of Fiji
Supreme Court of Fiji justices
Alumni of Sri Lanka Law College
Alumni of Visakha Vidyalaya
Living people
Primary Courts of Sri Lanka judges
Sri Lankan women judges
Year of birth missing (living people)